The Bristol Cable is an independent media company in Bristol, UK, founded in 2014. It provides local news through independent investigative journalism, in a quarterly print publication and website, both free. The Bristol Cable is a cooperative, owned by its members, who pay a monthly fee. The publication has a print run of 30,000 copies, distributed throughout the city.

The Bristol Cable was founded by Alec Saelens, Adam Cantwell-Corn and Alon Aviram. It is part of the Global Investigative Journalism Network.

History
As of December 2017 the co-op cost £1 per month to join, had 1,900 members who contributed on average £2.70 per month; and had six full-time staff. Membership provides a means of funding the newspaper and gives members a say in strategic decisions about the co-op.

In 2019 The Bristol Cable won the Press Gazette British Journalism Award for Local Journalism, noting its five year investigation into modern day slavery by a local employer. In 2021 the Press Gazette again noted the investigative journalism and successful development of The Bristol Cable, with membership at 2,600.

Stories broken by The Bristol Cable

The Bristol Cable has broken stories on workplace abuses in the catering sector (October 2014); Bristol University's holdings in fossil fuels, which was used by people campaigning for its divestment and prompted a change by the University (June 2015); ownership of property in the city by offshore companies based in tax havens (January 2016 and January 2018); the Mayor and senior council officials hiding the potential for deep well fracking from councillors and the public, to prevent disruption to the sale of Bristol Port land (May 2016); the use by local police of mass surveillance devices, known as IMSI-catchers or Stingray phone trackers, that eavesdrop on mobile phone and other devices, which became a national news story (October 2016); local companies' links to the arms trade (February 2017); poor working conditions (March 2017); racial bias in Immigration Enforcement officers' stop and checks of people on the street they suspect of immigration offences (October 2017, with the Bureau of Investigative Journalism); and the small share of new property developments given over to affordable housing, in comparison with the official policy of Bristol City Council (March 2018).

Other funding sources
To set up, produce its first issue, and launch citizen journalism workshops, it raised £3,300 in a crowdfunding campaign, was given £1,500 by Co-operatives UK and £1,600 by Lush. In 2017 it received a grant of £40,000 from the Reva and David Logan Foundation to expand its capacity in the local community. In 2018 it received a grant of £100,000 a year for two years from the Omidyar Network.

References

External links

The Bristol Cable print edition online archive

News magazines published in the United Kingdom
British news websites
Quarterly magazines published in the United Kingdom
Newspapers published in Bristol
Publishing cooperatives
2014 establishments in England